Fazel Darbandi, also Fadil al-Darbandi, also known as Molla Agha Darbandi (died 1869/1870, Tehran), was an Iranian Shia cleric and scholar of the Qajar era.

Biography
Darbandi's surname implies an origin in the city of Darband in Daghestan (now Russia), or its environs, although the exact whereabouts of his place and date of birth are unknown. Darbandi grew up to study in Najaf, in Ottoman Iraq, where he was a student of Molla Mohammad Sharif-ol-Olama Mazandarani (died 1829–1830).

Darbandi later tried to teach in the city of Karbala, but the "peculiarities" of his persona made it "impossible" to retain any number of students. Afterwards, he moved to Iran, arriving in Tehran where prime minister (ṣadr-e aʿẓam) Mirza Aqa Khan Nuri had just been dismissed.

Darbandi was famous amongst his contemporaries for being eloquent in both Persian as well as Arabic, as well as for "erudition" in the science related to "Hadith transmitters". After his death, he was buried in Karbala.

Notes

References
 

1869 deaths
1870 deaths
Iranian Shia clerics
Iranian scholars
19th-century Iranian people
People of Qajar Iran